(Spanish and Brazilian Portuguese),  (European Portuguese) or  (Catalan) is a generic term for cured meat products. The dictionary of the Royal Spanish Academy defines it as "intestine stuffed with minced meat, mainly pork; intestine stuffed with diverse ingredients" (the Spanish word comes from the verb "embutir", "to stuff"). The term often applies to any of the many varieties of cured, dry sausages found in the cuisines of Iberia and the former Spanish and Portuguese colonies.

In Philippine cuisine, however, due to the fusion of Spanish and American cuisine in the islands,  (or ) refers to a type of meatloaf wrapped around slices of egg and sausage.

Varieties
Specific varieties include, among many others (see list of sausages for the various countries):

Chorizo/chouriço
 Sobrassada from the Balearic Islands
 Botifarra from Catalonia
 Butifarra Soledeña
 Fuet from Catalonia
 Salchichón
 Blood sausage (morcilla, morcela)
 Androlla from Galicia
 Linguiça/longaniza
 Alheira
 Farinheira
 Botillo/botelo, also known as chouriço de ossos
 Paio
 Chosco de Tineo from Asturias

See also

 List of sausages

References

Catalan cuisine
Portuguese sausages
Spanish sausages
Philippine sausages
Fermented sausages